Manuel Chua (born ) is a Filipino model, actor, businessman, and politician.

Acting career
He was discovered in the Filipino version of a reality game show, Pinoy Fear Factor,  which was aired on ABS-CBN from November 2008 to February 2009, wherein he reportedly broke two of the show's world records. Chua is a member of ABS-CBN's Star Magic. Chua is a freelance artist.

Political career

Chua ran for member of city council of San Jose, Nueva Ecija in 2022 elections under PDP–Laban, wherein he was placed sixth.

Filmography

Television

Film

References

Living people
Filipino male models
Filipino male television actors
Participants in Philippine reality television series
Star Magic
Year of birth missing (living people)